This article refers to the football player. For other uses of the nickname, see, for example, :pt:Netinho

Artur Pereira Neto or simply Netinho (born April 24, 1984 in Itajaí), is a Brazilian attacking midfielder who currently plays for América-RN.

Honours
Paraná State League: 2005, 2009

Contract
 Atlético Paranaense : 1 March 2007 to 31 December 2010
 América Mineiro : 8 February 2011

External links 
 sambafoot.com
 rubronegro.net
 CBF
 atleticopr.com
 furacao.com
 zerozero.pt

1984 births
Living people
Brazilian footballers
Brazilian expatriate footballers
Brazilian expatriate sportspeople in Qatar
Guarani FC players
Club Athletico Paranaense players
Clube Náutico Capibaribe players
Al Ahli SC (Doha) players
América Futebol Clube (MG) players
Goiás Esporte Clube players
América Futebol Clube (RN) players
Association football midfielders